The Japanese barracuda (Sphyraena japonica) is a species of fish of the family Sphyraenidae, which can be found in West Pacific ocean near southern Japan as well as in the South China Sea.

References 

Sphyraenidae
Taxa named by Marcus Elieser Bloch
Taxa named by Johann Gottlob Theaenus Schneider
Fish described in 1801
Fish of the Pacific Ocean
Fish of Japan